Chiloglottis trullata, commonly known as the triangular orchid, is a species of orchid endemic to Queensland. It has two dark green leaves and a single small, green or pinkish flower with a shiny, dark reddish black, insect-like callus surrounded by reddish club-shaped calli covering most of the upper surface of the labellum.

Description
The callus and associated glands occupy most of the upper surface of the labellum. Flowering occurs in July and August.

Taxonomy and naming
Chiloglottis trullata was first formally described in 1991 by David Jones from a specimen collected in the Blackdown Tableland National Park and the description was published in Australian Orchid Research. The specific epithet (trullata) is a Latin word meaning "trowel", referring to the shape of the labellum.

Distribution and habitat
The triangular ant orchid grows near sandstone boulder in tall forest on the Blackdown Tableland.

References

External links 

trullata
Orchids of Queensland
Plants described in 1991